Jyoti Dhurve (born 2 June 1966) is an Indian politician, belonging to Bhartiya Janata Party. In the 2009 election she was elected to the 15th Lok Sabha from the Betul Lok Sabha constituency of Madhya Pradesh.

She is a post-graduate in Arts from Durga Mahavidyalaya, Raipur. She is widow and was married to Late Shri Prem Singh Dhurve. She has one son his name is pranjal dhurve and resides at Betul.

References

External links
 Fifteenth Lok Sabha Members Bioprofile in Lok Sahba website

India MPs 2009–2014
1966 births
Living people
People from Raipur, Chhattisgarh
People from Betul district
Women in Madhya Pradesh politics
Lok Sabha members from Madhya Pradesh
India MPs 2014–2019
Bharatiya Janata Party politicians from Madhya Pradesh
21st-century Indian women politicians
21st-century Indian politicians